Black Is White is a 1920 American silent drama film starring Dorothy Dalton and directed by Charles Giblyn. It was produced by Thomas H. Ince and distributed by Paramount Pictures. The movie is based on a novel, Black is White, by George Barr McCutcheon. The film's spelling differs from the spelling of the novel. The plot is one in which a woman stands almost any form of abuse from a man and finally forgives him at the moment she has opportunity for the revenge she has always sought, such stories being somewhat popular at the time.

Prints of the film exist at the Library of Congress and UCLA Film and Television Archive.

Plot
As described in a film magazine, Margaret Brood (Dalton) is driven from her home by her jealous husband Jim (Herbert), who after imagining that she is untrue to him finally doubts if he is the father of their son. She causes a report to be published that she is dead and goes to Paris to live with a distant relation, taking the name Yvonne. Fifteen years later her husband comes to Paris, is attracted by what he considers is her resemblance to his dead wife, and marries her. She returns to America with him. Unable to hide her love for her son, she arouses her husband's suspicions and in a moment of rage he shoots the young man. After nursing her son back to health, Margaret tells her husband the truth, produces proof that she has always been true to him, and forgives him.

Cast
Dorothy Dalton as Margaret Brood / Yvonne Strakosch
Holmes Herbert as Jim Brood (credited as Holmes E. Herbert)
Jack Crosby as Frederick Bond
Clifford Bruce as Baron Demetrious Strakosch
Claire Mersereau as Lyda Desmond
Lillian Lawrence as Mrs. Desmond
Joseph Granby as Ranjab
Patrick Barrett as Daws
Tom Cameron as Riggs

References

External links

 
AllMovie/synopsis

1920 films
American silent feature films
Films based on American novels
Films directed by Charles Giblyn
Paramount Pictures films
Silent American drama films
American black-and-white films
1920 drama films
1920s American films